The Great Comet of 1861, formally designated C/1861 J1 and 1861 II, is a long-period comet that was visible to the naked eye for approximately 3 months. It was categorized as a great comet—one of the eight greatest comets of the 19th century.

It was discovered by John Tebbutt of Windsor, New South Wales, Australia, on May 13, 1861, with an apparent magnitude of +4, a month before perihelion (June 12). It was not visible in the northern hemisphere until June 29, but it arrived before word of the comet's discovery.

On June 29, 1861, Comet C/1861 J1 passed 11.5 degrees (23 Sun-widths) from the Sun. During the Earth close approach, the comet was estimated to be between magnitude 0 and −2 with a tail of over 90 angular degrees. As a result of forward scattering, C/1861 J1 even cast shadows at night (Schmidt 1863; Marcus 1997). During the night of June 30 – July 1, 1861, the famed comet observer J. F. Julius Schmidt watched in awe as the great comet C/1861 J1 cast shadows on the walls of the Athens Observatory. The comet may have interacted with the Earth in an almost unprecedented way. For two days, when the comet was at its closest, the Earth was actually within the comet's tail, and streams of cometary material converging towards the distant nucleus could be seen.

By the middle of August, the comet was no longer visible to the naked eye, but it was visible in telescopes until May 1862. An elliptical orbit with a period of about 400 years was calculated, which would indicate a previous appearance about the middle of the 15th century, and a return in the 23rd century.  Ichiro Hasegawa and Shuichi Nakano suggest that this comet is identical with C/1500 H1 that came to perihelion on April 20, 1500 (based on 5 observations).

It was hypothesized that C/1861 G1 (Thatcher) and this comet are related, and that in a previous perihelion (possibly the 1500 one), C/1861 G1 broke off of this comet, as the two comets have many similar orbital characteristics. However, this was disproved in 2015 by Richard L. Branham Jr., who used modern computing technology and statistical analysis to calculate a corrected orbit for C/1861 J1.  By 1992, this great comet had traveled more than 100 AU from the Sun, making it even farther away than dwarf planet Eris. It will come to aphelion around 2063.

Tebbutt's account 
In his Astronomical Memoirs, Tebbutt gave an account of his discovery:

Observations in writing

June 30, 1861
Raphael Semmes, commander of the CSS Sumter wrote of the June 30 escape of his vessel from New Orleans:  

Samuel Elliott Hoskins, a doctor from Guernsey, observed:

July 1, 1861
Granville Stuart noted the observation of this comet in a journal entry on July 1, 1861, while living in western Montana: 

Sarah R. Espy, of Alabama, in her private journal: 

Emily Holder, wife of Joseph Bassett Holder, while stationed at Fort Jefferson, Florida: 

Martin Bienvenu, an officer on a ship at Bangkok, in his unpublished journal:

July 2, 1861
Raphael Semmes, commander of the CSS Sumter: 

R.W. Haig, the Chief Astronomer of the 49th Parallel Boundary Commission in British Columbia, wrote in a letter home 

Charles Wilson, surveyor on the Boundary Commission with Haig, wrote

July 5, 1861
James Riley Robinson, on the schooner Conchita, in the Mexican harbor of Agiabampo.

July 7, 1861
S. Watson, a tea inspector for the British firm Bull & Purdon writes from Hong Kong

References

External links 
 C/1861 J1 (Great Comet of 1861) on Cometography.com
 The Comet of 1861, Gallery of Natural Phenomena
 JPL DASTCOM Comet Orbital Elements
 Orbital simulation from JPL (Java) / Ephemeris

Non-periodic comets
18610531
Great comets